Daltrey is the debut solo studio album by English singer-songwriter Roger Daltrey, lead vocalist of the Who. It was released on 20 April 1973 by Track Records in the United Kingdom and MCA Records in the United States. Daltrey was the third member of the group to make a solo album. The bulk of the record (ten of the twelve songs) was written by David Courtney and Leo Sayer. It took six weeks to record during January and February 1973. Sessions took place at Daltrey's Barn Studio, Burwash, East Sussex, where the backing tracks were laid down; vocals, overdubs, and mixing was completed at the Beatles' Apple Studios at 3 Savile Row (the vocals for "One Man Band (reprise)" were recorded on the Apple rooftop, where the Beatles had performed their famous final concert in January 1969), and at Nova Sound Studios.

The album was recorded during a hiatus in the Who's touring schedule. The first single released from the album, "Giving It All Away", reached number five in the UK and the album made the Top 50 in the United States. He also released a single in 1973, "Thinking"; its B-side, "There is Love", features Jimmy Page of Led Zeppelin on guitar. Bizarrely, the British release, with considerable airplay of "Giving it All Away" (first lines "I paid all my dues so I picked up my shoes, I got up and walked away") coincided with news reports of the Who being sued for unpaid damage to their hotel on a recent tour, including a TV set being thrown out of the window.

David Courtney and former British pop teen idol Adam Faith co-produced the album.

Cover artwork
The album was packaged in a gatefold sleeve, photographed and designed by Daltrey's cousin Graham Hughes, featuring a Victorian locket-style soft-focus image, portraying Daltrey with Pre-Raphaelite looks. The inner sleeve photography shows a trompe-l'œil in reference to the Narcissus myth, as Daltrey's reflection in the water differs from his real appearance. The cover itself features an image of Daltrey also shown in the film Tommy (1975).

Album background
The success of the album caused some upheavals behind the scenes. With Pete Townshend being generally regarded as The Who's mouthpiece, Daltrey's renewed confidence now placed him in a strong position to influence the group policy. The Who's management team, Kit Lambert and Chris Stamp, were reportedly concerned that the album might spell the end of The Who or at the very least, a Rod Stewart and the Faces-type situation where the singer's solo success eclipsed the parent band. To Daltrey, at the time, these fears were misplaced. "I think it will do The Who some good if it's a hit, and I think there's a market for my album", he told Chris Charlesworth. The fact that Lambert and Stamp tried to derail the album's chances for the aforementioned reasons and their increasingly erratic handling of the group's affairs meant that their days as The Who's managers were numbered in Daltrey's eyes. He entrusted his affairs to Track employee Bill Curbishley who was fast rising through the ranks, having already successfully renegotiated the terms of a European Who tour the previous year.

Composition
All but two of the songs were co-written by the previously unknown David Courtney and Leo Sayer, the latter of whom later became a well-known singer in his own right. At the time, Daltrey was playing in his home recording studio with Sayer, who told Daltrey about his struggles to get a record deal. Daltrey, joking, asked Sayer to write him some songs for a solo album. Sayer and Courtney came back with ten songs, which Daltrey recorded for his first solo album.

Sayer enjoyed greater chart success than Daltrey did as a solo artist; the opening track on this album, "One Man Band" (also reprised at the end), became one of Sayer's biggest hits.

Critical reception

In a contemporary review for Creem, Robert Christgau said "by anybody else, this would be one more dumb concept album, and it still is." He found its exploration of the musician's plight pitiful and believed Daltrey lacked "the personality or the smarts to assert himself as an interpreter." In a retrospective review, AllMusic's Dave Thompson said that the album was "a sometimes horrifying shock for die-hard fans, but a pleasant surprise for anyone tired of hearing him voice the increasingly dictatorial Townshend's self-aggrandizement."

Track listing
All songs written by David Courtney and Leo Sayer except where noted.

Non-album material

Personnel

Musicians
 Roger Daltrey – lead vocals, acoustic guitar
 Dave Courtney – piano
 Russ Ballard – guitar, piano on "The Story So Far"
 Bob Henrit – drums
 Dave Wintour – bass guitar

Additional musicians
 Brian Cole – steel guitar
 Roy Young Band – brass
 Dave Arbus – violin on "The Way of the World"
 Jimmy Page – guitar on out-take "There Is Love"

Technical
 Del Newman – string arrangements on "You Are Yourself", "You and Me", "It's a Hard Life" and "Giving it All Away"
 John Mills – Recording engineer Apple Studios & Burwash
 Richard Dubb – Recording engineer for strings
 George Peckham – Cutting engineer
 Nigel Oliver – Tape operator

Sales chart performance
Album

Singles

See also
Roger Daltrey discography

References

External links 
 
 Giving it All Away Performed on German TV at YouTube
 Giving it All Away Performed on The Old Grey Whistle Test (Excerpt) at YouTube

1973 debut albums
Roger Daltrey albums
Track Records albums
Albums recorded at Apple Studios